Aliabad (also Romanized as ‘Alīābād) is a village in Avajiq-e Shomali Rural District, Dashtaki District, Chaldoran County, West Azerbaijan Province, Iran. At the 2006 census, its population was 169, in 28 families.

References 

Populated places in Chaldoran County